Mark Vines was the defending champion but lost in the first round to Bill Scanlon.

Wojciech Fibak won in the final 6–2, 6–2, 6–2 against Scanlon.

Seeds
A champion seed is indicated in bold text while text in italics indicates the round in which that seed was eliminated.

  Brian Gottfried (semifinals)
  Mel Purcell (second round)
  Wojciech Fibak (champion)
  Jay Lapidus (quarterfinals)
  Marcos Hocevar (semifinals)
  Eric Fromm (first round)
  Bruce Manson (second round)
  Bill Scanlon (final)

Draw

 NB: The Final was the best of 5 sets while all other rounds were the best of 3 sets.

Final

Section 1

Section 2

External links
 1982 Paris Open draw

Singles